Central Elementary School may refer to: 

In Canada
 Central Elementary School (Port Coquitlam, British Columbia)

In the United States
(by state)
 Central Elementary School (Magnolia, Arkansas)
Central Elementary School, Simsbury, Connecticut, included in Horace Belden School and Central Grammar School NRHP listing
 Central Elementary School (Seaford, Delaware)
 Central Elementary School (Lake Bluff, Illinois)
 Central Elementary School (Dodge City, Kansas)
 Central Elementary School (Olathe, Kansas)
 Central Elementary School (Paintsville, Kentucky)
 Central Elementary School (Edgewater, Maryland)
 Central Elementary School (Albemarle, North Carolina) 
 Central Elementary School (New Bern, North Carolina), listed on the NRHP in Craven County, North Carolina
 Central Elementary School (Wahpeton, North Dakota)
 Central Elementary School (Allison Park, Pennsylvania)
 Central Elementary School (Union City, Tennessee), listed on the NRHP in Obion County, Tennessee
 Central Elementary School (Belmont, California)
 Central Elementary School (Pleasant Grove, Utah)